Below is a list of notable people born in Tetovo, North Macedonia or its surroundings:

Historical figures 
 Mehmet Akif Pasha, statesman and governor of the Ottoman Empire
 Mujdin Aliu, combatant of the Kosovo Liberation Army, fought in the Kosovo War
 Hafëz Jusuf Azemi, Balli Kombetar and Albanian rights activist in exile  
 Mara Buneva, revolutionary, member of the Internal Macedonian Revolutionary Organization
 Dervish Cara, revolutionary leader known for his role in the Uprising of Dervish Cara
 Gajur Deralla, military captain of Balli Kombetar
 Mehmet Pashë Deralla, signatory of the Albanian Declaration of Independence; Minister of War in the Provisional Government of Albania
 Hayrullah Fişek, General in the Ottoman army, Undersecretary of State, Ministry of National Defence
 Mehmet Gega, teacher and Albanian rights activist
 Nevzat Halili, teacher and Albanian rights activist
 Rexhep Jusufi, military captain of Balli Kombetar
 Sabri Kalkandelen, poet, chief of the Istanbul Imperial Library
 Mehmet Akif Pasha, statesman and governor of the Ottoman Empire
 Todor Skalovski, composer of the Macedonian national anthem
 Tajar Tetova, military commander and activist of the Albanian national awakening
 Jefrem Janković Tetovac, Orthodox bishop
 Rexhep Voka, scholar and activist of the Albanian national awakening

Sports figures

Footballers 
Note: Only players that have been capped at international level
 Xhelil Abdulla, Footballer
 Nedim Bajrami, Footballer 
 Buran Beadini, footballer
 Naser Beadini, footballer
 Egzon Bejtullai, footballer 
 Argjend Beqiri, former football player; assistant coach of the Macedonia national football team
 Boško Đurovski, former football player
 Milko Đurovski, former football player
 Blerim Džemaili, Swiss football player
 Vulnet Emini, footballer
 Bajram Fetai, footballer
 Ferhan Hasani, Macedonian football player; best player in the Prva Liga in 2011 
 Agim Ibraimi, football player; Macedonian Footballer of the Year in 2012
 Harun Isa, footballer
 Ismail Ismaili, footballer
 Mevlan Murati, footballer
 Nebi Mustafi, footballer
 Valmir Nafiu, football player
 Emran Ramadani, footballer
 Shaqir Rexhepi, footballer

Other Sports
 Dardan Dehari, ski racer
 Lina Gjorcheska, tennis player
 Dusko (Dan) Markovic, ranked 4th in 1986 World's Strongest Man

Politicians 
 Abdylaqim Ademi, Minister of Environment and Physical Planning of North Macedonia
 Teuta Arifi, mayor of Tetovo
 Fatmir Besimi, Deputy Prime Minister in charge of European Integration of North Macedonia
 Ljube Boškoski, former Interior Minister of Macedonia
 Alajdin Demiri, former mayor; Albanian rights activist
 Antonio Milošoski, foreign minister of North Macedonia
 Agim Nuhiu, interior Minister of North Macedonia
 Menduh Thaçi, former leader of Democratic Party of Albanians
 Arben Xhaferi, politician, advocated for the rights of ethnic Albanians in North Macedonia

Arts 
 Dragana Čuprina, television personality and model
 Elita 5, music group
 Branko Gapo, film director, cinematographer
 Shpat Kasapi, singer
 Riste Tevdoski, singer, former member of the group Bravo Band
 Apostol Trpeski, cinematographer
 Mirko Vidoeski, painter and writer

Tetovo
List